Silapathar Town College, established in 1993, is a major and general degree college situated in Silapathar, Assam. This college is affiliated with the Dibrugarh University.

Departments

Arts
 Assamese
 English
History
Education
Economics
Philosophy
Political Science
Sociology

References

External links
https://www.silapathartc.in/

Universities and colleges in Assam
Colleges affiliated to Dibrugarh University
Educational institutions established in 1993
1993 establishments in Assam